Slørdahl is a Norwegian surname. Notable people with the surname include:

 Philip Slørdahl (born 2000), Norwegian footballer 
 Stig Arild Slørdahl (born 1959), Norwegian cardiologist and healthcare manager

Norwegian-language surnames